The Unwanted (Spanish: La indeseable) is a 1951 Argentine drama film directed by Mario Soffici and starring Zully Moreno, Carlos Thompson and Guillermo Battaglia.

The film's sets were designed by the art director Gori Muñoz.

Cast
 Zully Moreno as Elsa Robles
 Carlos Thompson as Carlos Álvarez
 Guillermo Battaglia as Fernando Aguirre
 Eduardo Cuitiño 
 Pascual Pellicciotta
 Domingo Mania
 Pilar Gómez
 José Ruzzo
 Adolfo Linvel
 Nelly Meden
 Luis Corradi
 Tito Grassi 
 Jesús Pampín
 Carlos Belluci
 Luis Mora
 Enrique Giacobino
 Warly Ceriani
 Julián Pérez Ávila
 Carmen Giménez 
 Martha Atoche
 Aida Villadeamigo

External links
 

1951 films
1950s Spanish-language films
Argentine black-and-white films
Argentine drama films
Films directed by Mario Soffici
1951 drama films
1950s Argentine films